The Colin Stephen Quality Handicap is an Australian Turf Club Group 3  Thoroughbred open quality handicap horse race for horses three years old and older, over a distance of 2400 metres, held annually at Rosehill Racecourse, Sydney, Australia in September. Total prize money for the race is A$200,000.

History

Name

The race is named after the former chairman of the Australian Jockey Club Sir Colin Stephen (1872-1937). Stephen was a solicitor, horse racing administrator, racehorse owner/breeder and polo player.
A committee member from 1912 served on the Sir Adrian Knox sub-committee which framed the rules of racing of that year and as chairman of the Australian Jockey Club from 1919, Stephen was determined to make racing in New South Wales a clean and healthy pastime. In 1933 his revised rules were adopted throughout Australia. Sir Colin Stephen’s racing colours of Pale blue, white cap were carried to success by the Ascot Vale Stakes winners Fidelity 1936 & Caesar 1937 defeating the champion Ajax.

This race was called the AJC Spring Stakes until 1938. In 1976, 1983, 1988 and 2006 it was known as the AJC Queens Cup. During 1989 and 1995 the race was called the AJC The Japan Trophy race. In 1977 it was the AJC Jubilee Handicap.

In 2016 the event was raced as the Queen's Cup, which was also held at Rosehill in 2022.

Grade

 1870–1978 - Principal race
 1979–1982 - Listed race
 1983 - Group 3
 1984–1986 - Listed race
 1987 onwards - Group 3

Distance

 1870–1871 – 1 miles (~2600 metres)
 1872–1971 – 1 miles (~2400 metres)
 1972–2000 - 2400 metres
 2001 - 2200 metres
 2002 onwards - 2400 metres

Venue

 1870–1982 - Randwick Racecourse
 1983 - Warwick Farm Racecourse
 1984–1999 - Randwick Racecourse
 2000–2001  - Warwick Farm Racecourse
 2002–2003  - Randwick Racecourse
 2004 - Warwick Farm Racecourse
 2005–2010  - Randwick Racecourse
 2011 onwards - Rosehill Racecourse

Conditions
 The race was run at Weight for age from 1938 to 1972.

1934 & 1943 racebooks

Gallery of noted winners

Winners

 2022 - Grove Ferry
 2021 - Entente
 2020 - Attorney
 2019 - Stampede
 2018 - Miss Admiration
 2017 - Auvray
 2016 - Allergic
 2015 - Amelie's Star
 2014 - Deane Martin
 2013 - Julienis
 2012 - Kelinni
 2011 - Lamasery
 2010 - No Wine No Song
 2009 - Mr Clangtastic
 2008 - Get Up Jude
 2007 - ‡race not held
 2006 - Exinite
 2005 - Railings
 2004 - Don Raphael
 2003 - Outlaws
 2002 - Red Trinket
 2001 - Dress Circle
 2000 - Coco Cobanna
 1999 - Vita Man
 1998 - In Joyment
 1997 - Heart Ruler
 1996 - Hula Flight
 1995 - Western Approaches
 1994 - Restitution
 1993 - Zamination
 1992 - Garter King
 1991 - Pontiac Lass
 1990 - Fine Catch
 1989 - Macquarie Prince
 1988 - Natski
 1987 - Algonquin Club
 1986 - Rising Fear
 1985 - Silver Award
 1984 - Forward Charge
 1983 - Noble Heights
 1982 - Nicholas John
 1981 - Granite King
 1980 - Bragabout
 1979 - Outcome
 1978 - Taksan
 1977 - Saramore
 1976 - Tara Regent
 1975 - Medici
 1974 - Public Service
 1973 - The Fixer
 1972 - Gunsynd
 1971 - Regal Rhythm
 1970 - Great Exploits
 1969 - Nausori
 1968 - Roman Consul
 1967 - Garcon
 1966 - Prince Grant
 1965 - Amusement Park
 1964 - Piper's Son
 1963 - Summer Fair
 1962 - Burgos
 1961 - Lord Fury
 1960 - Valerius
 1959 - Valerius
 1958 - Prince Darius
 1957 - Baron Boissier
 1956 - Redcraze
 1955 - Electro
 1954 - Advocate
 1953 - Hydrogen
 1952 - Dalray
 1951 - Delta
 1950 - Delta
 1949 - Vagabond
 1948 - Dark Marne
 1947 - †Russia / Silver Link
 1946 - Good Idea
 1945 - Russia
 1944 - Flight
 1943 - Katanga
 1942 - Katanga
 1941 - Beau Vite
 1940 - Beau Vite
 1939 - †Royal Chief / Mosaic
 1938 - Royal Chief
 1937 - Allunga
 1936 - Silver Ring
 1935 - Peter Pan
 1934 - Rogilla
 1933 - Rogilla
 1932 - Veilmond
 1931 - Phar Lap
 1930 - Phar Lap
 1929 - Winalot
 1928 - Limerick 
 1927 - Limerick
 1926 - Spearfelt
 1925 - Windbag
 1924 - Gloaming
 1923 - David
 1922 - Beauford
 1921 - David
 1920 - Kennaquhair
 1920 - Poitrel
 1919 - Poitrel
 1918 - Poitrel
1917 - Wallace Isinglass
1916 - Sasanof
1915 - St. Carwyne
1914 - St. Carwyne
1913 - Duke Foote
1912 - Aurofodina
1911 - Aurofodina
1910 - Comedy King
1909 - Trafalgar
1908 - Mooltan
1907 - Poseidon
1906 - Lady Wallace
1905 - Emir
1904 - Gladsome
1903 - Cruciform
 1902 - Wakeful
1901 - San Fran
1900 - Paul Pry
1899 - Dewey
1898 - Merloolas
1897 - Positano
1896 - Newhaven
1895 - Quiver
1894 - Brockleigh
1893 - Loyalty
1892 - Bungebah
1891 - Megaphone
 1890 - Carbine
1889 - Abercorn
1888 - The Australian Peer
1887 - Trident
1886 - Lord William
1885 - Moonshee
1884 - Malua
1883 - First Demon
1882 - Hecla
1881 - Wellington
1880 - Creswick
1879 - Chester
1878 - Chester
1877 - Robinson Crusoe
1876 - Valentia
1875 - Kingsborough
1874 - Javelin
1873 - Dagworth
1872 - Dagworth
1871 - Aveline
1870 - Illumination 

† Dead heat
‡ Not held because of outbreak of equine influenza

See also
 List of Australian Group races
 Group races

References

Horse races in Australia